The Romantic Swordsman is a Hong Kong television series adapted from Gu Long's novel Duoqing Jianke Wuqing Jian of the Xiaoli Feidao Series. The series was first broadcast on TVB in Hong Kong in 1978.

Cast
 Note: Some of the characters' names are in Cantonese romanisation.

 Paul Chu Kong as Lei Cham-fan
 Wong Yuen-sun as Ah-fei
 Wong Hang-sau as Lam Sin-yee
 Maggie Li / Wan Lau-may as Lam See-yan
 Ko Miu-see / Susanna Au-yeung as Suen Siu-hung
 Kong Ngai as Sam-mei / Tin-kei Old Man
 Ng Man-tat as Suen Tat
 Kong To / Law Kwok-wai as Lung Siu-wan
 Kwan Hoi-san as Mr. Iron Flute
 Lam Wai-to as Kwok Sung-yeung
 Kwan Chung as King Mou-meng / Yau Lung-sang
 Chan Fuk-sang as Ling-ling
 Kam Hing-yin as Yi-ku
 Yim Chau-wah / Law Ho-kai as Lung Siu-wan
 Leung Hung-wah as Lui Fung-sin
 Tsui Kwai-heung as Nam Kit-chi
 Cheung Chung / Lau Dan as Sheung-koon Kam-hung
 Wong Wan-choi as Sheung-koon Fei
 Ho Lai-nam as Bak Sheh / King Mou-meng
 Leung Siu-tik as Sai-mun Yau
 Lee Ka-ding as Chu-kok Tit-kwai
 Lai Kim-hung as Yin Seung-fei
 Mak Dai-sing as Wu Bat-kwai

See also
 The Sentimental Swordsman
 The Romantic Swordsman (1995 TV series)
 Flying Daggers

External links
 

1978 Hong Kong television series debuts
1978 Hong Kong television series endings
TVB dramas
Hong Kong wuxia television series
Works based on Xiaoli Feidao (novel series)
Cantonese-language television shows
Television shows based on works by Gu Long